Silver Car Crash (Double Disaster) is a 1963 serigraph by the American artist Andy Warhol. In November 2013, it sold for $105 million (£65.5m) at NYC auction, setting a new highest price for a work by Warhol.

History
Silver Car Crash (Double Disaster) depicts a body twisted in the mangled interior of a silver car. It was printed by Andy Warhol at the age of 35. It is the last serigraph of the artist that was left in private hands. This painting was part of his Death and Disaster series.  

The art masterpiece was held by a European collector for 20 years. In November 2013, five bidders fought for the serigraph in an auction of contemporary art works organized by Sotheby's, bringing the price to $105 million. The name of the winner was never disclosed to the public.

The final price was above the expectations of the organizers, because the serigraph was estimated at $60–80 million. The price broke the previous record paid for a Warhol serigraph, $100 million paid for Eight Elvises.

See also
 Eight Elvises
 List of most expensive paintings

References

1963 paintings
Paintings by Andy Warhol